New Point Baptist Church is a historic church at 17 E. Kinney Street in Newark, Essex County, New Jersey, United States.

It was built in 1849 and added to the National Register of Historic Places in 1972.

See also 
 National Register of Historic Places listings in Essex County, New Jersey

References

Baptist churches in New Jersey
Churches on the National Register of Historic Places in New Jersey
Churches completed in 1849
Churches in Newark, New Jersey
National Register of Historic Places in Newark, New Jersey
1849 establishments in New Jersey
New Jersey Register of Historic Places